The 1992 United States presidential election in Wyoming took place on November 3, 1992, as part of the 1992 United States presidential election. Voters chose three representatives, or electors to the Electoral College, who voted for president and vice president.

Wyoming was won by incumbent President George H. W. Bush (R-Texas) with 39.70 percent of the popular vote over Governor Bill Clinton (D-Arkansas) with 34.10 percent. Businessman Ross Perot (I-Texas) finished in third, with 25.65 percent of the popular vote. Clinton ultimately won the national vote, defeating incumbent President Bush. This election was the closest result Wyoming had in its electoral history since 1948, when it narrowly voted for Harry S. Truman over Thomas E. Dewey. In fact, this would become the first election since 1948 that the state was decided by single digits, and the last as of 2020.

, this is the last election in which Natrona County and Carbon County voted for the Democratic candidate. It was also the first time any Wyoming county had voted for a Democrat since Jimmy Carter won Sweetwater County in 1976, and the first time Teton County voted for a Democratic presidential candidate since it voted for Franklin D. Roosevelt over Wendell Willkie in 1940.

Results

Results by county

See also
 United States presidential elections in Wyoming
 Presidency of Bill Clinton

Notes

References

Wyoming
1992
1992 Wyoming elections